Emerson Augusto Thome (born 30 March 1972), also known as Paredão, is a Brazilian retired footballer who played as a central defender.

Career
He first came to England towards the end of the 1997–98 season when moving to Sheffield Wednesday from Portuguese club Benfica, who signed him from Tirsense in 1994–95, when the "jesuítas" stood one win away from a UEFA Cup position. Whilst at Hillsborough. Thome scored twice for Wednesday, once against Stockport County in the FA Cup and once against Wimbledon in the league.

In late 1999, with the Owls staring at the prospect of possible relegation in the face, he made the move to Chelsea for a fee of £2.7 million. He was to remain at Stamford Bridge for just nine months, as he found it hard to break up the tried and tested central defensive partnership of Marcel Desailly and Frank Leboeuf. Thome was cup-tied for Chelsea's victorious 1999–2000 FA Cup campaign. He did however start when Chelsea memorably beat FC Barcelona 3-1 in the first leg of their UEFA Champions League quarter-final. Just one game into the 2000–2001 season Thome was sold to Premiership rivals Sunderland for a fee of around £4 million.

During his time at the Stadium of Light, Thome struggled with injuries and Sunderland were reluctant to extend his contract. A clause in his contract with Sunderland meant that a considerable sum had to be paid to Chelsea after he played 50 matches. Sunderland were not willing to pay the extra appearance based fee, hence their reasons for not playing Thome towards the end of the 2002–2003 season, a campaign which ended in relegation. Thome scored twice for Sunderland, netting in league games against Coventry City and Aston Villa.

In August 2003, Thome joined Bolton Wanderers on a free transfer, and became a regular campaigner for the Trotters as they finished eighth in the Premier League and reached the League Cup final where they lost to Middlesbrough at the Millennium Stadium. In the summer of 2004, he moved to Championship side Wigan Athletic along with former Bolton teammate Per Frandsen. Thome was part of the Wigan side which were promoted to the Premier League for the first time in their history in 2005. His second season with the Latics saw him face less playing time which resulted in Thome being loaned out to Championship side Derby County for several months. Once the loan had expired with Derby County, he returned to Wigan Athletic where on the 7 February 2006, the Latics decided to release him from his contract. Following his release by Wigan, Thome joined Japanese side Vissel Kobe. He remained there for two seasons. In 2007, Thome announced his retirement from professional football.

Since his retirement from playing football, Thome now works for Everton F.C. as a chief scout in Portugal since late 2008.

Honours
Internacional
 Campeonato Gaúcho: 1992

Tirsense
 Segunda Liga: 1993–94

Benfica
Taça de Portugal: 1995–96

Chelsea
 FA Cup: 1999–00
 FA Community Shield: 2000

Bolton Wanderers
 Football League Cup: Runner-up 2003–04

Wigan Athletic
 Football League Cup: Runner-up 2005–06

References

External links

 

1972 births
Living people
Footballers from Porto Alegre
Brazilian footballers
Association football defenders
Campeonato Brasileiro Série A players
Sport Club Internacional players
Liga Portugal 2 players
Associação Académica de Coimbra – O.A.F. players
Primeira Liga players
S.L. Benfica footballers
F.C. Alverca players
Premier League players
Sheffield Wednesday F.C. players
Chelsea F.C. players
Sunderland A.F.C. players
Bolton Wanderers F.C. players
Wigan Athletic F.C. players
Derby County F.C. players
J1 League players
J2 League players
Vissel Kobe players
Brazilian expatriate footballers
Brazilian expatriate sportspeople in Portugal
Expatriate footballers in Portugal
Expatriate footballers in England
Brazilian expatriate sportspeople in Japan
Expatriate footballers in Japan
Everton F.C. non-playing staff